Oxalobacter is a genus of bacteria in the Oxalobacteraceae family. The species are chemoorganotrophs and strictly anaerobic. They are found in rumens of animals such as cattle and in feces of other animals and humans. Some are marine and some have been isolated from fresh water. These bacteria are characterized by their ability to metabolize oxalate.

The genus was first identified in 1985.

References

External links
NCBI taxonomy browser

Burkholderiales
Bacteria genera